Srinath Prahlad (born 8 January 1973) is a tennis player from India. He won two bronze medals at the 1998 Asian Games and competed in the Davis Cup. He reached one ATP doubles final partnering fellow Indian Saurav Panja at the 2000 Chennai Open but lost 7–5, 6–1 to Julien Boutter and Christophe Rochus. He started an academy named SAT Sports at Bangalore.

References

External links
 
 

Asian Games medalists in tennis
Indian male tennis players
Tennis players at the 1998 Asian Games
Living people
1973 births
Sportspeople from Thrissur
Asian Games bronze medalists for India
Medalists at the 1998 Asian Games
Racket sportspeople from Kerala